Venerable Petronilla of Chemillé (died 24 April 1149) was the first abbess of the double monastery of Fontevrault in western France, which she headed from 1115 to 1149 following her second widowhood.

Born Petronilla of Craon, she became a follower of Robert of Arbrissel, himself a Beatified. After Philippa of Toulouse persuaded her husband, William IX, Duke of Aquitaine, to grant Robert land for the foundation of an abbey, Robert left both Hersende de Champagne and Petronilla in charge of monitoring the construction and organization. A year before Robert's death, he named her first abbess.

Order of Fontevrault 
The first biography of Blessed Robert of Arbrissel was written by Baudri, Archbishop of Dol, his friend, in Brittany, at the request of Venerable Petronilla of Chemillé, widow, and first Abbess of this immense and celebrated monastery, who was named by Blessed Robert to replace him at his death as Superior General of the Order of Fontevrault. The feast of Venerable Petronilla was celebrated by the Order of Fontevrault on April 24. The Bollandists remark: "Her existence was marked by many contradictions, but she had the courage to pass beyond the judgment of human beings and to walk without deviating on the path to heaven."

References 

Guérin, Mgr Paul (ed.) - Vie des Saints, Vol. 5, p. 2. (Paris, 1876, 7th ed.).
Laffont, Robert - "L'Abbaye De Fontevraud" p. 61. (Paris 2001)

12th-century French nuns
12th-century venerated Christians
Abbesses of Fontevraud
Year of birth missing
1149 deaths